Sleep Forever is the second album by San Diego rock band Crocodiles. It was released by American label Fat Possum Records the year after the band's debut, Summer of Hate. Sleep Forever was recorded in a vintage studio in Joshua Tree in California's Mojave Desert by James Ford of Simian Mobile Disco. The record incorporates various styles and shows krautrock, indie, noise rock, psychedelic, shoegaze, drone rock, and '60s girl-group influences. Additional musicians on the album include the band's touring keyboard player Robin Eisenberg and producer James Ford, who played drums.

Reviewers have noted the often macabre lyrical content of the songs. Sleep Forever was featured on NME and Rough Trade 's albums of the year lists.

Track listing

References 

2010 albums
Crocodiles (band) albums
Fat Possum Records albums